Giovanni Battista Ingoni (1528–1608) was an Italian painter, of the late Renaissance, active in his native Modena, Italy.

He is not highly regarded by Giorgio Vasari, who describes him as a rival of Nicolo Abati and active also in Rome, Parma, and Perugia. There is a large canvas of the baptism of Christ in the Galleria Nazionale di Parma. He painted one of the altarpieces in San Pietro, Modena.

References

1528 births
1608 deaths
16th-century Italian painters
Italian male painters
17th-century Italian painters
Painters from Modena
Italian Renaissance painters